Cosmote TV is the corporate name for two pay television services in Greece, owned by Greek telecommunication operator OTE. The two services are as follows:

Cosmote TV via OTT – Streaming platform
Cosmote TV via Satellite – Satellite television service

Cosmote TV Satellite broadcasts on Ku band from Eutelsat 9B at 9.0°E featuring DVB-S2 -8PSK/MPEG-4 technology. In June 2012 OTE TV had 76,345 subscribers. In July 2017, after more than five years of operation, it was announced that the package has reached 510,000 subscribers. By the end of March 2021 Cosmote TV had 578.000 subscribers making it the market leader in TV services.

History
In 1999, it was announced that television station Alpha TV was considering a co-operation with ERT and Greek Telecommunications giant OTE to launch a digital platform. Despite such plans being approved by the management boards of the said companies in February 2000, they were abandoned in September of the same year, as soon as OTE, which had launched a package of channels through Hotbird, left the project. Alpha TV and ERT would separately proceed with the launch of platforms Alpha Digital and ERT Digital; they ended up shutting down due to financial difficulties and low amounts of subscribers. The said package would continue transmitting, featuring international themed channels, which were gradually replaced with Greek local ones.

In 2009, OTE launched an IPTV service called Conn-x-TV. It was initially available in Athens, Thessaloniki, Patras, Larisa, and Iraklion, it is available in most of Greece.

In October 2011, Conn-x TV was re-branded as OTE TV via Conn-x. At the same time, OTE launched their long-anticipated satellite service known as OTE TV via Satellite. Both services operate under the OTE TV brand and contain the same logo.

In March 2012, OTE TV had 63,497 subscribers. OTE decided to reorganise the tv unit and a new commercial directorate was created aiming to commercially push the tv service to OTE and non OTE broadband customers by enhancing the quality of the content offered, creating new tv packs with OTE branded channel and focusing on a new hybrid service using satellite for linear transmission and broadband for on demand content. By the end of June 2012, reports say that the subscribers of OTE TV, both satellite and IP customers, had reached a total of 76,345. In November 2013, following a management restructuring OTE TV reached 230,000 subscribers, most of them using the satellite service. In August 2014, the number of OTE TV subscribers surpassed 300,000 customers.

By the end of June 2015, OTE TV had 377,548 subscribers, while in June 2016 the platform had 458,920 subscribers (21.6% rise).

In January 2016, OTE TV announced the creation of OTE History, Greece's first local documentary channel, exclusively focused on Greek history, culture, and civilization.

In August 2016 the OTE TV platform surpassed Nova Greece's subscribers reaching 462,000 customers.

In November 2016 OTE TV was re-branded as Cosmote TV and its respective branded channels as Cosmote Cinema, Cosmote Sports, and Cosmote History. Moreover, as of November 2016, Cosmote TV has agreements with three of the six major studios, Walt Disney Pictures, Paramount Pictures and Universal Pictures.

In January 2017 Cosmote TV reached 500,000 subscribers. In July 2017 it was referred that Cosmote TV had reached 510,000 subscribers.

In 2017, Cosmote TV did not renew its co-operation with Discovery, Inc. as discussions between the two parties have not led to a mutually acceptable agreement. The take down of these channels was a successful move as there was no impact on customer figures and customer satisfaction. Therefore, the following eight channels: Discovery Channel, Discovery HD, Discovery Science, Investigation Discovery, Animal Planet, Eurosport 1, Eurosport 2 and TLC have been replaced by BBC Earth, Crime & Investigation, CBS Reality, Fine Living, Food Network, Fox Sports, Nautical Channel, Outdoor Channel, Viasat Explore and Viasat Nature.

Channel list

Greek National FTA
Vouli Tileorasi
ERT1 HD
ERT2 HD
ERT3 HD
ERT News
ANT1 HD
ALPHA HD
STAR HD
SKAI HD
MAKEDONIA TV HD
MEGA HD
OPEN HD

Greek Regional FTA
4E TV
Attica TV
Action 24
One Channel
New Epsilon TV
Aigaio TV Dodecanese
ENA Channel
Vergina TV Central Macedonia
CreteTV
New Television Crete
Star Central Greece
TV 100

Greek Subscription
Naftemporiki

Cinema & Series
Cosmote Cinema 1 HD
Cosmote Cinema 2 HD
Cosmote Cinema 3
Cosmote Series HD
Cosmote Series Marathon HD
Village Cinema HD
TCM Movies
FOXlife HD
FOX HD

Sports
Cosmote Sport Highlights HD
Cosmote Sport 1 HD
Cosmote Sport 2 HD
Cosmote Sport 3 HD
Cosmote Sport 4 HD
Cosmote Sport 5 HD
Cosmote Sport 6 HD
Cosmote Sport 7 HD
Cosmote Sport 8 HD
Cosmote Sport 9 HD
Cosmote Sport 4K
Cosmote Sport AEK Super League Pass
Cosmote Sport Olympiacos Super League Pass
Cosmote Sport Panathinaikos Super League Pass
Edge Sport HD
Nautical Channel HD
Motorvision TV HD
Ginx TV

Documentary
Cosmote History
National Geographic HD
National Geographic Wild HD
BBC Earth
Viasat History
Viasat Nature
Viasat Explore
Crime & Investigation
Museum TV

Lifestyle
E! HD
CBS Reality
Luxe TV HD
FashionTV
My Zen TV

Kids
Disney Channel
Disney Junior
BabyTV
Duck TV
Smile TV
Nickelodeon Greece

Music
MAD TV
MAD Viral
Panik TV
MTV Global
MTV Live
MTV 00s
Mezzo TV
Stingray CMusic
Stingray iConcerts

News
ERT World
BBC World News
Sky News
CNN
DW-TV
France 24 Original
France 24 English
Al Jazeera
Al Arabiya
Asharq News
Bloomberg TV Europe
CNBC Europe
Euronews Greek
Euronews English

Adult
Blue Hustler (with no extra cost for full pack subscribers)
Sirina TV HD (with extra cost)
Penthouse HDTV (with extra cost)
Hustler TV HD (with extra cost)
Vixen (with extra cost)

See also
Internet in Greece

References

External links

Entertainment companies of Greece
2008 establishments in Greece
Television networks in Greece
Companies based in Athens
Mass media companies established in 2008
Mass media companies of Greece